World Asthma Day is an annual event organized by the Global Initiative for Asthma (GINA) to improve asthma awareness and care around the world. World Asthma Day is held on the first Tuesday in May. The theme of 2021's event was "Uncovering Asthma Misconceptions," and for 2022, "Closing Gaps in Asthma Care."

The inaugural World Asthma Day was held in 1998.

References

External links 
 World Asthma Day
 Case Studies in Environmental Medicine (CSEM):  Environmental Triggers of Asthma – Agency for Toxic Substances and Disease Registry, U.S. Department of Health and Human Services.

Asthma
May observances
Asthma